The second season of America's Got Talent: The Champions featured around 40 participants from across the Got Talent franchise, ranging from winners, live round participants – quarter-finalists (where applicable), semi-finalists and finalists – and other notable acts. This season had the same host and judges, except Mel B was replaced by Alesha Dixon.

Overview
The contest's preliminaries featuring around 10 participants. While those receiving a golden buzzer in each preliminary would secure an automatic place in the grand-final, remaining places would be competed for in two semi-finals, each consisting of the two highest voted in each preliminary, along with a third in each voted for by the judges from amongst those placing 3rd, 4th and 5th respectively in the audience vote. The following table lists each participant that took part, and their history in the Got Talent franchise – per respective international version, season, and performance, within chronological order from first to more recent appearance:

 |  |  |  | 
 |  Golden Buzzer Finalist

Preliminaries Summary
 |  | 
 |  |  Buzzed out |  Judges' choice

Preliminary 1 (January 6)

Preliminary 2 (January 13)

  Ben Blaque's performance was terminated mid-way into his routine, due to an overwhelming concern from the judges it was too life-threatening to continue.
  Mandel did not cast his vote, due to the majority support for Ryan Niemiller from the other judges, but noted his vote would have made it unanimous.
  Shin Lim, a noted participant in the Got Talent franchise, made a special appearance as part of Marc Spelmann's performance.
  For health and safety reasons, Spencer Horsman's performance had to be conducted outside the venue and with paramedics on standby; both the audience and judges were in attendance for this.

Preliminary 3 (January 20) 

  Due to the majority vote for Alexa Lauenburger, Klum's voting intention was not disclosed.

Preliminary 4 (January 27)

Semi-finals (February 3)
 | 
 |  |  Buzzed out |  Judges' choice 

  Due to the majority vote for Duo Transcend, Mandel's voting intention was not disclosed.

Finals (February 10)
 |  | 

Guest Performers: KISS, Kseniya Simonova, Lindsey Stirling, Shin Lim, Colin Cloud, Kodi Lee, Travis Barker

Ratings

References

America's Got Talent
Competitions